Fred Enock aka Frederick Enock (17 April 1845 Manchester - 26 May 1916 Hastings) was an English microscopist, illustrator and naturalist.

Biography 
His parents were Robert Enock (1811-1855) and Elizabeth Enock (née Doeg) (1810-1867). Their children were Charles Robert Enock (1837-1900), Arthur Henry Enock (1839-1917), Amy Jane Dell (née Enock) (1841-1885), Robinson Enock (1843-1909), Frederick Enock (1845-1916), Emma Enock (1847-1868), Edwin Enock (1849-1924) and Sophia Elizabeth Derrington (née Enock) (1853-1933).

Fred married Jennie Burton (1852-?) on 21 March 1872 at the Hornsey Road Methodist Chapel (now a police station) in Islington, London.

Fred's uncle, Edmund Wheeler, was a commercial slide mounter who became notable for the quality and volume of his preparations from the 1860s to the 1880s, when he sold his business to W. Watson & Sons. Fred Enock assisted in Wheeler's insect preparations through much of the 1870s.

Schooling
14 August 1855 - 1 February 1860 -  Ackworth School, Pontefract Road, Ackworth, Pontefract - Robinson, Emma and Edwin all went here, but were in different classes. Between his tenth and fifteenth year, Fred did not see his family except for the one-month annual summer holiday. Most of his family from his grandfather down, had also attended Ackworth School.

His occupation at the various times of census was given as
1861 - Machinist apprentice,
1871 - Naturalist,
1881 - Professor of Natural History (microscopic), 
1891 - Scientific Lecturer Natural History,
1901 - Lecturer in Science School,
1911 - Science Lecturer

Addresses before marriage
59 Stock Street, Cheetham, Manchester 1845-c1846
Stratford Road, Sparkbrook, Birmingham 1851-c1854
Balsall Heath Road, Balsall Heath, Birmingham 1861-?
48 Tollington Road, Islington 1871-1872 (with uncle Edmund Wheeler)

After marriage
3 Andover Road, Islington 1872-?
2 Mount Pleasant Rd, Upper Holloway	1873
25 Balsall Heath Rd, Birmingham	1874
30 Russell Rd, Islington	1880-1882
Ferndale, Woking Station	1882-1883
21 Prospero Rd, Upper Holloway 1885
11 Parolles Rd, Upper Holloway	1889
21 Manor Gardens, Holloway	1895-1898
13 Tufnell Park Rd, Holloway	1911-1915
54 St Mary's Terrace, West Hill, Hastings	1916

Gallery

Bibliography
Davidson, B.M. 'Fred Enock 1845-1916—The Man and His Work', Microscopy, 36 (Autumn 1992), pp. 657–674

References

External links
 
 Gallery of insects

Microscopists
English illustrators
English naturalists
1845 births
1916 deaths